Human Experiments (also known as Beyond the Gate) is a 1979 American horror film directed and co-produced by Gregory Goodell. It stars Linda Haynes, Geoffrey Lewis, Ellen Travolta, Aldo Ray,
Jackie Coogan and Lurene Tuttle. This film earned its notoriety for being targeted by England's Director of Public Prosecutions during the video nasty furore in the early 1980s. Although it was listed on the first "video nasty" list issued by the DPP on July 4, 1983, the film was never prosecuted under the Obscene Publications Act and had originally been given an uncut (now defunct) X rating by the BBFC for theatrical release in 1979.

Plot
Rachel Foster (Linda Haynes) is a country singer travelling alone through the United States. She resists the advances of lecherous bar owner Mat Tibbs (Aldo Ray) and in her hurry to leave town, she accidentally wrecks her car. Looking for assistance, she finds what appears to be an abandoned house - but after stumbling inside the place, she discovers the scene of a grisly multiple homicide perpetrated by a young boy. As no one believes that the child is responsible for such a horrific act, she's railroaded into a women's correctional facility by the prurient bar owner's brother Sheriff Tibbs (Jackie Coogan). As well as falsely charged with the murders, the innocent musician now finds herself at the mercy of prison psychiatrist Doctor Kline (Geoffrey Lewis) who has diabolical intentions. Kline has some radical techniques for "curing" criminality, and after a failed escape attempt she undergoes his 'treatment' and completely loses her mind. After she is rehabilitated her name is changed to Sarah Jean Walker. Afterwords the warden gets notice that the boy woke up and confessed to killing his whole family. Klein, in an effort to keep Rachel under his thumb and to hide his radical therapy methods, tries to have Rachel kill the warden but, Rachel seems to come to and break the programming.  She shoots the office up and seems to wound Klein.  Sometime later, Rachel is seen once again singing in a dive bar, however, she now goes by her new name, Sarah Jean Walker.

Cast
Linda Haynes as Rachel Foster  
Geoffrey Lewis as Dr. Hans Kline  
Ellen Travolta as Mover  
Aldo Ray as Matt Tibbs 
Jackie Coogan as Sheriff Tibbs  
Lurene Tuttle as Granny  
Mercedes Shirley as Warden Weber  
Bobby Porter as Derril Willis 
Darlene Craviotto as Rita

Home video
Scorpion Releasing released the film on Blu-ray in 2018, featuring an audio commentary track with director Greg Goodell.

Extended version

References

Citations

General and cited references 
 Martin, John: The Seduction of the Gullible: Curious History of the British "Video Nasties" Phenomenon. Nottingham: Procrustes Press, 1993, page 206. .

External links
 
 

American horror films
Women in prison films
1970s exploitation films
1979 films
1979 horror films
1970s prison films
1970s road movies
1970s English-language films
1970s American films
English-language horror films